Epsilon Virginis (ε Virginis, abbreviated Epsilon Vir, ε Vir), formally named Vindemiatrix , is a star in the zodiac constellation of Virgo. The apparent visual magnitude of this star is +2.8, making it the third-brightest member of Virgo.

Stellar properties

Vindemiatrix is a giant star with a stellar classification of G8 III. With 2.6 times the mass of the Sun, it has reached a stage in its evolution where the hydrogen fuel in its core is exhausted. As a result, it has expanded to over ten times the Sun's girth and is now radiating around 77 times as much luminosity as the Sun. This energy is being emitted from its outer atmosphere at an effective temperature of 5,086 K, which gives it the yellow-hued glow of a G-type star. Since 1943, the spectrum of this star has served as one of the stable anchor points by which other stars are classified.

Nomenclature

ε Virginis (Latinised to Epsilon Virginis) is the star's Bayer designation.

It bore the traditional names Vindemiatrix and Vindemiator, which come from Greek through the Latin vindēmiātrix, vindēmiātor meaning 'the grape-harvestress'. Additional medieval names are Almuredin , Alaraph, Provindemiator, Protrigetrix and Protrygetor. In 2016, the International Astronomical Union organized a Working Group on Star Names (WGSN) to catalog and standardize proper names for stars. The WGSN's first bulletin of July 2016 included a table of the first two batches of names approved by the WGSN; which included Vindemiatrix for this star.

This star, along with Beta Virginis (Zavijava), Gamma Virginis (Porrima), Eta Virginis (Zaniah) and Delta Virginis (Minelauva), were Al ʽAwwāʼ, which is Arabic for 'the Barker'.

References

External links
 

Virginis, Epsilon
Virgo (constellation)
G-type giants
Vindemiatrix
Virginis, 047
063608
4932
113226
Durchmusterung objects
TIC objects